Obereopsis angustifrons is a species of beetle in the family Cerambycidae. It was described by Stephan von Breuning in 1957.

References

angolana
Beetles described in 1957